Kmeťov is glacial waterfall in the High Tatras at about  in Poprad District, Slovakia.

References

Waterfalls of Slovakia
Poprad